The Cafaro Company is an American  property management and real estate development company which owns several retail shopping centers throughout the United States.

History
Brothers William M. Cafaro and John A. Cafaro began developing grocery stores for Kroger starting in 1942.  In 1949, the Cafaros formed the Cafaro Company and moved on to developing shopping centers, starting with a grocery plaza in Sharon, Pennsylvania. The two brothers managed the non-grocery tenants in the centers they developed. In 1965, they opened their first regional mall property, American Mall in Lima, Ohio. The company’s first regional mall projects were localized to Ohio, Michigan, Indiana, Pennsylvania, and West Virginia throughout the 1970s and 1980s. In 1970, Cafaro opened the first enclosed mall in Iowa, Kennedy Mall in Dubuque. In 1988, Target Corporation asked the company to develop centers for the retailer in the Pacific Northwest, expanding the company portfolio to Washington and Oregon. In April 1998, William M. Cafaro passed and his son, Anthony M. Cafaro, Sr. took over as president after having overseen leasing and construction operations since 1969.

Leading in to the 21st century, the Cafaro Company divulged in portfolio diversification with projects such as the Eastwood Field baseball park and multi-function complexes such as the renovated Millcreek Mall and Spotsylvania Towne Centre. Anthony M. Cafaro, Sr., retired as president of the Cafaro Company in December 2009, and was succeeded by his sons Anthony Cafaro, Jr. and William A. Cafaro. Under their leadership, the company has made investments in residential real estate.

Enclosed mall properties

Former properties

Canceled
Liberty Lake Mall, Spokane, Washington

References

External links
Official website

 
Real estate companies of the United States
Privately held companies based in Ohio
Companies based in Youngstown, Ohio
Shopping center management firms
Financial services companies of the United States
1949 establishments in Ohio
Retail companies established in 1949
American companies established in 1949